David Graham Stevens  (born January 1962) is a British businessman, and was CEO of Admiral Group from 2016-2020.

Early life
David Graham Stevens, was born in January 1962. He graduated from the University of Oxford. He earned an MBA from INSEAD in 1988.

Career
Stevens worked for McKinsey & Company from 1988 to 1991.

In May 2015, it was announced that the founder of Admiral, Henry Engelhardt, would step down as CEO, and be replaced in 2016 by Stevens, the COO.

In March 2020, Stevens announced his retirement as CEO of Admiral.

Awards
Stevens was appointed a CBE in the 2010 Birthday Honours list "For services to the insurance industry and to charity".

References

1962 births
Living people
Alumni of the University of Oxford
Commanders of the Order of the British Empire
INSEAD alumni
English chief executives